Katherine Gallagher (born 7 September 1935) is an Australian poet resident in London. Translations of her poems have appeared in French, German, Hebrew, Italian, Romanian and Serbo-Croat.
Gallagher translated from French to English Jean-Jacques Celly's poems in The Sleepwalker with Eyes of Clay.

Awards
1978, Australian Literature Board Fellowship.
1981, Brisbane Warana Prize.
1986, nomination of "Passengers to the City" for the John Bray National Poetry Award.
2000, Royal Literary Fund award.
2008, London Society of Authors' Foundation award.

Career
Writer in Residence at Railway Fields Nature Reserve, Harringay, in 2002.
Writers Inc/Blue Nose Poets' Education Officer until 2008. In 2004/2005 this included coordinating the Young Writer's Mentorship Project funded by the Arts Council.
Poet in Residence for Havering Council's third annual Parks and Arts Healthy Lifestyle Walk in Hornchurch Country Park on 17 July 2006.
Founder of the Poetry Society Stanza Group (London North), started in March 2007.

References

See also

South Australian Premier's Awards

External links
Arc Publications
Society of Authors

Australian poets
1935 births
Living people